Reigate is a constituency in Surrey represented in the House of Commons of the UK Parliament since 1997 by Crispin Blunt of the Conservative Party.

Constituency profile
The seat is predominantly in the London commuter belt with good rail services from Reigate, Redhill and Banstead to Central London. Several financial companies are based in the seat. Residents are wealthier than the national average.

Boundaries

1885–1918: The Borough of Reigate, its Sessional Division, and those of Dorking and Godstone except Effingham, Mickleham, Caterham, Warlingham, Chelsham and Farleigh

1918–1950: The Borough of Reigate, the Urban District of Dorking, and the Rural Districts of Dorking and Reigate

1950–1974: The Borough of Reigate, and the Rural District of Godstone
1974: what had been the Rural District was ceded to the East Surrey seat; Banstead U.D. was taken from the Carshalton seat
1974–1983: The Borough of Reigate, and the Urban District of Banstead
1983: The northern heart of what had been Banstead U.D. (four wards) were ceded to the Epsom and Ewell seat
1983–1997: The Borough of Reigate and Banstead wards of Chipstead Hooley and Woodmansterne, Horley East, Horley West, Kingswood with Burgh Heath, Reigate Central, Reigate East, Reigate North, Reigate North Central, Reigate North East, Reigate South Central, Reigate South East, Reigate South West, Salfords and Sidlow, and Tadworth and Walton

1997–2010: The Borough of Reigate and Banstead wards of Banstead Village, Chipstead Hooley and Woodmansterne, Kingswood with Burgh Heath, Reigate Central, Reigate East, Reigate North, Reigate North Central, Reigate North East, Reigate South Central, Reigate South East, Reigate South West, Salfords and Sidlow, and Tadworth and Walton

2010–present: The Borough of Reigate and Banstead wards of Banstead Village, Chipstead Hooley and Woodmansterne, Earlswood and Whitebushes, Kingswood with Burgh Heath, Meadvale and St John's, Merstham, Preston, Redhill East, Redhill West, Reigate Central, Reigate Hill, Salfords and Sidlow, South Park and Woodhatch, and Tadworth and Walton

The seat is in Surrey bordering Greater London and is centered on the town of Reigate from which it takes its name. As shown by the map the constituency excludes most of the post town of Horley in the East Surrey seat and Banstead (including its progeny or neighbourhoods Nork, Preston and the Tattenhams) in the Epsom and Ewell seat but contains the rest of the Reigate and Banstead district.

History
This constituency was first created with the first election of Burgesses to Parliament in 1295, electing two members. It continued to elect two members until 1832 when its representation was reduced to one member by the Great Reform Act.

In 1868 the constituency was disenfranchised for corruption, but was revived in 1885 by the Redistribution of Seats Act 1885 when the East Surrey constituency was abolished. Since 1918 the seat has been held by a candidate in the Conservative Party with the exception of four months during which the anti-EU MP in 1997 before the election of that year joined the Referendum Party (UK). The Liberal Democrats including their two predecessor parties amassed their largest share of the vote in 2010. The largest opposition party changed from Labour to the Liberal Democrats in 2005 and 2010, then UKIP in 2015 and back to Labour in the 2017 general election.

In 1974, the seat saw major boundary changes which removed some of Eastern Surrey which was in the seat into the radically redesigned East Surrey seat and added the Banstead area to the seat.

Members of Parliament

MPs 1295–1660

MPs 1660–1832

MPs 1832–1868
 Representation reduced to one (1832)

MPs since 1885
 Constituency revived (1885)

Elections

Elections in the 2010s

}}

Elections in the 2000s

Elections in the 1990s

This constituency underwent boundary changes between the 1992 and 1997 general elections and thus change in share of vote is based on a notional calculation. George Gardiner changed party from the Conservative Party to the Referendum following his deselection by the local Conservative association.

Elections in the 1980s

Elections in the 1970s

Elections in the 1960s

Elections in the 1950s

Election in the 1940s

Elections in the 1930s

Elections in the 1920s

Elections in the 1910s

Election results 1885-1918

Elections in the 1880s

Elections in the 1890s

Elections in the 1900s

Elections in the 1910s

General Election 1914–15:

Another General Election was required to take place before the end of 1915. The political parties had been making preparations for an election to take place and by July 1914, the following candidates had been selected; 
Unionist: Richard Hamilton Rawson
Liberal:

Election results 1832-1868

Elections in the 1830s

Elections in the 1840s
Somers-Cocks succeeded to the peerage, becoming 2nd Earl Somers and causing a by-election.

Elections in the 1850s

Hackblock's death caused a by-election.

Rawlinson was appointed a member of the Council of India, requiring a by-election

Elections in the 1860s
Monson succeeded to the peerage, becoming Lord Monson and causing a by-election.

Pre-1832 election results

Elections in the 1830s

Joseph Sydney Yorke's death caused a by-election.

He was unsuccessful and stood again for Reigate.

See also
List of parliamentary constituencies in Surrey

Notes

References

Sources

Election 2010 - Reigate BBC News
Reigate Election 2005 - Reigate BBC News
Vote 2001 - Reigate BBC News
Election results, 1997 - 2001 Election Demon
Election results, 1983 - 1992 Election Demon

Parliamentary constituencies in South East England
Constituencies of the Parliament of the United Kingdom established in 1295
Constituencies of the Parliament of the United Kingdom disestablished in 1868
Constituencies of the Parliament of the United Kingdom established in 1885
Parliamentary constituencies disenfranchised for corruption
Politics of Surrey
Reigate